Hongqiao Road is an interchange station between Lines 3, 4 and 10 on the Shanghai Metro. It is the southernmost station of which Lines 3 and 4 share the same tracks. The interchange with Line 10 opened on 10 April 2010.

The station is located in Changning District, Shanghai.

Station Layout

References

Shanghai Metro stations in Changning District
Line 3, Shanghai Metro
Line 4, Shanghai Metro
Line 10, Shanghai Metro
Railway stations in China opened in 2000
Railway stations in Shanghai